William John Greer Rosbotham (1909 - date of death unknown), was a Northern Ireland international lawn bowler.

Bowls career
He won a gold medal in the pairs at the 1954 British Empire and Commonwealth Games in Vancouver, with Percy Watson.

He was the 1973 Northern Ireland singles champion.

Personal life
He was a civil servant by trade and lived in Loughgall, County Armagh.

References

1909 births
Date of death unknown
Bowls players at the 1954 British Empire and Commonwealth Games
Commonwealth Games medallists in lawn bowls
Commonwealth Games gold medallists for Northern Ireland
Male lawn bowls players from Northern Ireland
Sportspeople from County Armagh
Medallists at the 1954 British Empire and Commonwealth Games